"Check the Rhime" is the first single from A Tribe Called Quest's second album The Low End Theory. The song was written by group members Phife Dawg, Q-Tip, and Ali Shaheed Muhammad. It was recorded at the legendary Greene St. Recording studio in New York City. The song peaked at number 59 on Billboard on November 16, 1991. Rolling Stone listed "Check the Rhime" as one of the group's 20 essential songs, noting that Phife Dawg "quickly proves himself Q-Tip's lyrical equal."

Music video
The music video, directed by Jim Swaffield, starts out in front of houses and moves to a dry cleaning business in St. Albans, Queens, New York City, where the group performs on the roof in front of a large crowd. The dry cleaners shop featured in the video is still at the corner of 192nd St. & Linden Blvd. in St. Albans. In 2016, a mural was commissioned on the wall of the business after the death of the group's founding member, Phife Dawg.

Charts

Weekly charts

Certifications

References

1991 singles
A Tribe Called Quest songs
1991 songs
Jive Records singles
Song recordings produced by Q-Tip (musician)
Songs written by Q-Tip (musician)
Songs written by Ali Shaheed Muhammad
Songs written by Richard Rudolph
Songs written by Leon Ware
Songs written by Phife Dawg